Cardinal climber is a common name for several plants and may refer to:

 Ipomoea × multifida
 Ipomoea × sloteri

See also
 Cardinal creeper (Ipomoea horsfalliae)
 Cardinal vine (Ipomoea quamoclit)